The Ilut Stadium is a football stadium in Ilut, located near Nazareth in northern Israel. The stadium is the home ground of Maccabi Ahi Nazareth.

Bnei Sakhnin, Hapoel Acre and Hapoel Nazareth Illit have all played at the ground whilst their stadiums were being upgraded.

Maccabi Ahi Nazareth F.C.
Buildings and structures in Nazareth
Football venues in Israel
Sports venues in Northern District (Israel)